Count Krsto II Oršić Slavetićki, (1718–1782) was a Croatian nobleman and high-ranking officer in the Habsburg monarchy imperial army service, a member of the Oršić noble family.

Life
Krsto Oršić was the son of Bernard III Oršić Slavetićki and his wife Ana née Patačić. He was educated in Bologna and Vienna. In 1741 he devoted himself to military career, taking part in several wars and many battles like War of the Austrian Succession and Seven Years' War. He achieved the rank of Field Marshal.

During his lifetime, Oršić performed some other duties as well, for instance the assessor at the Croatian Parliament seat in Zagreb and grand župan of Zagreb County. In 1744, he married the Hungarian countess, Josipa (Jozefa) Zichy (1725–1778)  who bore him sons Adam (1748–1820) and Franjo (1758–1807).

As a descendant of a distinguished and rich noble family, he owned a large number of castles, palaces and estates in Croatia, e.g. Gornja Stubica Castle, Gornja Bistra Castle at Zaprešić, Slavetić Castle at Jastrebarsko, Jurketinec Castle at Varaždin, castle in Severin na Kupi  and palaces in Zagreb and Varaždin. On the site of a previous fortress from the Middle Ages in Gornja Stubica, he had a brand new baroque castle built in 1756. Between 1770 and 1775 he had another baroque castle constructed on his Gornja Bistra estate.

After he retired from the army, Krsto Oršić withdrew with his wife Josipa to his newly built Gornja Bistra castle, where they spent their last years together. Josipa soon died (in 1778 in neighbouring Oroslavje) and Krsto lived alone until his death in Zagreb in 1782.

See also
 Oršić Castle in Gornja Stubica
 List of noble families of Croatia

External links
Krsto Oršić - a member of an old Croatian noble family
Count Krsto Oršić was an inhabitant of Gornja Stubica in 18th century
Krsto Oršić - most distinguished member of the Oršić family in the 18th century

Krsto Count Oršić of Slavetić - Feldmarschalleutnant of the Habsburg monarchy imperial army
Files of Adam Oršić, Krsto's son

Croatian nobility
Counts of Croatia
Croatian military personnel in Austrian armies
1718 births
1782 deaths
18th-century Croatian nobility